Héloïse Adélaïde Letissier (born 1 June 1988), known professionally as Christine and the Queens and Redcar, or occasionally simply Chris, is a French singer and songwriter. Born and raised in Nantes, he started learning piano at the age of four and found inspiration in one of London's clubs while studying. Letissier released a series of extended plays throughout 2011–2013.

His debut album, Chaleur humaine (2014), received critical acclaim, reached number 2 on both French and UK charts, and was certified diamond in France; it was also a best selling debut record in the United Kingdom. In 2018, he released his second album, Chris, to further critical acclaim. It was ranked album of the year by Clash, The Guardian, and The Independent, and placed in top-ten of nine other year-end lists. "Girlfriend" was recognized by Time as song of the year. In reaction to his mother's death, Letissier released in 2020 an EP La Vita Nuova, with some critics calling it his strongest work up to that point. Time again named his song, "People, I've Been Sad", the song of the year.

In 2016, Letissier was ranked number 1 in Vanity Fair list of most powerful and influential French people who "promote French genius", ahead of the country's president. The next year, Forbes placed him on its list of 30 most influential and talented people under 30, and Time included him on its list of Next Generation Leaders twice – in 2016 and 2018. His accolades include four Victories of Music awarded by French Ministry of Culture. Christine and the Queens has been signed to the independent record label Because Music since 2012.

Early life
Héloïse Adélaïde Letissier was born on 1 June 1988 in Nantes. Her father, Georges Letissier, taught English literature at the University of Nantes and specialises in Victorian era literature. His mother, Martine Letissier, taught both French and Latin at a local middle school. Martine died suddenly from a heart infection in April 2019, in the week between Letissier's two scheduled Coachella performances on 13 and 20 April; the latter was cancelled because Letissier travelled back to France to be with her.

Letissier began learning to play the piano at the age of four, learned classical dance at five, and then modern jazz. His parents recommended to him writers such as Sarah Waters and Judith Butler, whose works served both as inspiration and reference in Letissier's youth. He attended Lycée Clemenceau learning theatre and then Lycée Fénelon secondary school in Paris learning literature.

In 2010, Letissier had to leave the theater conservatory, as he was depressed after a romantic break-up. He made a trip to London and was inspired by the work of local drag queen musicians, including Russella, at the Soho nightclub Madame Jojo's. The queens then became 'the Queens' in his stage name as a tribute. As soon as he returned to France, he left the ENSL grande école in the middle of the second year to devote himself fully to the musical project now called "Christine and the Queens". He dedicated many of his creations to them, and to all transgender individuals, describing his genre as "freakpop".

Career

2010–2013: EP releases and early live appearances
Letissier gave his first recital as Christine and the Queens at a small Lyon club in 2010. He released his debut extended play, Miséricorde, in 2011, with Marc Lumbroso (Jean-Jacques Goldman's producer). His second EP, titled Mac Abbey, followed in 2012, with minor hits "Narcissus Is Back" and "Cripple". The same year, he was the opening act for Lykke Li, The Dø, and Woodkid. Letissier won the Best Discovered Act award, known as "Découverte", at the Printemps de Bourges music festival and also won the "Première Francos" award at the Les Francofolies de La Rochelle festival. Then he signed with the independent label Because Music.

In 2013, Letissier was the opening act for Lilly Wood and the Prick and Gaëtan Roussel. On 3 June, he released the single, and also an EP of the same name, titled "Nuit 17 à 52", which garnered him his first charting on the official French SNEP albums chart. The song was the first single of his forthcoming studio album.

2014–2017: Christine and the Queens

Christine and the Queens' debut album, Chaleur humaine, was first released in France on 2 June 2014. He was almost the sole writer and producer; the track "Paradis perdus" is a cover of a 1973 French song. Besides "Nuit 17 à 52", three singles were released: "Saint Claude", "Christine", and "Paradis Perdus". "Christine" is the French version of "Cripple" earlier released in 2012. After the album reached number 2 on the French chart and was certified diamond there, Letissier toured France.

For the American market, the single "Tilted", English version of "Cripple"/"Christine", was released on 3 March 2015 under the Neon Gold Records label. Letissier then toured in the US for promotion with Marina and the Diamonds. Exclusively for this market, Saint Claude EP was released on 14 April, including five songs from Chaleur humaine in English versions. On 16 October, the full album, entitled Christine and the Queens, was released via Because Music. Many tracks were reworked with English lyrics and revamped beats by producer Ash Workman. Two tracks were replaced with three new songs, and two of these new songs were collaborations – "Jonathan" with Perfume Genius, and "No Harm Is Done" with rapper Tunji Ige. These two new collaborations were released as additional singles, the latter on 11 September, and the former on 16 October. On 11 November, Christine was warmly received in his first performance in large venue, the Webster Hall, New York; the next day, he appeared on The Daily Show. In 2015 top-ten lists by Time, "Tilted" was included as one of best songs of the year. Pitchfork listed the song in its 2010 best-of, "defining tracks of the decade" list at number 106. At the end of the year, he was back home, and, on 10 December, Madonna invited Christine to dance with her on stage during her concert at the Bercy Arena, Paris.

In the United Kingdom, "Tilted" was released on 15 January 2016 and peaked at number 20 on the UK Singles chart. An English version of the album was released there on 26 February, under the original French title. The record received universal critical acclaim. In April, Christine performed for the first time, and twice, at the Coachella festival. In May, he was added to the BBC Radio 1 main rotation playlist, and on 17 June, he appeared on The Graham Norton Show. The Guardian called his performance at the Glastonbury Festival on 24 June, the day after the Brexit vote, one of the festival's "unequivocal highlights" and later described it as "career-launching". Chaleur humaine reached number 2 on the UK Albums chart in July and was the best selling debut album of 2016 there. It was featured on some year-end lists and ranked 3rd by NME and 8th by The Guardian, among other accolades. In the decade-end 'top albums of the 2010s' listings, the record was ranked No. 40 by The Independent and No. 81 by NME. In September, he put together a cover of Beyoncé's "Sorry" in the BBC Live Lounge; for arrangement and rendition he was included in the "6 Best New Songs of the Week" list by Vulture. The same month, when he was performing at the Camden Roundhouse, Elton John sang "Tilted" with hims on stage; John had earlier bought Letissier's French album and praised him greatly. In November, Letissier performed in London, Manchester, and Glasgow, selling 16,000 seats in a few hours each time. In October, he was chosen as one of BBC's 100 Women. He appeared twice on the Jools' Annual Hootenanny show, on 31 December, and on 1 January 2017.

Having toured intensively during 2014-16, he stopped at the end of 2016, saying later, "I didn't want to burn out on the first [album]".

The song "iT" was featured on the television series Girls in the closing scenes and credits of the series 5th season's episode "Old Loves", which aired on 13 March 2016. The single "Tilted" was used in the season 2 finale of the Better Things series, its characters recreating the song's video as a graduation gift; this episode aired on 16 November 2017.

2018–2019: Chris

For his second studio album, Letissier had early sessions with both Mark Ronson and Damon Albarn, but eventually decided to work alone, with Cole M.G.N. as co-producer on some tracks. "Confident in his decision to go it alone, [he] cut [his] hair short and started again as Chris. 'I wanted to risk it all,' [he] said, smiling." In April 2018, he announced a tour across North America and Europe, planned for the autumn. In July, Christine also announced details of an upcoming album titled Chris. It was preceded by the release of two singles, each in an English and French version: "Girlfriend"/"Damn, dis-moi" on 17 May, and "Doesn't Matter"/"Doesn't Matter (Voleur de soleil)" on 5 July. Later, he also released the singles: English-language "5 Dollars" on 16 August, and French-language "La marcheuse" on 23 August.

Chris was released on 21 September 2018 and received universal critical acclaim. AllMusic editors summarised: "the singer/songwriter's triumphant second album borrows from '80s R&B and questions gender roles, engaging minds, hearts, and bodies along the way." Robert Steiner of The Boston Globe called the album "a refreshing, empowering record" and complimented its "stellar production and contagiously danceable jams", as well as Letissier's "engrossing lyricism". Although he felt that the album "loses steam" in its second half, Steiner named "The Walker" as a highlight for its "poignant" portrayal of a victim of domestic violence. Chris peaked at number 2 on the French and at No. 3 on the UK chart. The record featured at the top of many year-end best-of lists, ranked number one by Clash, The Guardian, and The Independent, and placed in the top-five of five other lists, for a total of 12 positions in top-ten. "Girlfriend" was named song of the year by Time. In the 'top pop albums of the 2010s' listings, Chris was ranked No. 15 by Consequence, ahead of Rihanna's Anti and Ariana Grande's Thank U, Next, and No. 24 by Paste, ahead of Lady Gaga's Born This Way and Adele's 25.

In May 2019, Letissier performed during the season finale for the eleventh season of RuPaul's Drag Race held at the Orpheum Theatre in Los Angeles. The same month, he headlined the All Points East festival in London, marking his first UK headline festival appearance. His performance was well received; The Independent gave the concert five stars, calling it "a tiny tour de force".

On 17 July, Charli XCX released the single "Gone" alongside the music video, a joint effort with Letissier, which they debuted earlier together at the end of May during the Primavera Sound festival. The track was shortlisted by BBC Radio 1 DJ Annie Mac for the Hottest Record of The Year, voted for by the public, and finished in third position. Pitchfork listed the song at number four on its list of 2019's 100 best songs and at number 145 for the 200 best songs of the 2010s. In September, the duo performed the song again at the Electric Picnic festival, on The Jonathan Ross Show to promote the release of Charli XCX's album, and on The Tonight Show Starring Jimmy Fallon.

2020-2021: La vita nuova

On 5 February 2020, Letissier released "People, I've Been Sad", the first single from his forthcoming extended play. La vita nuova ('The New Life'), containing five tracks and one bonus track, was released on 27 February. Again, he was the sole writer, with Ash Workman as co-producer. Letissier simultaneously released a conceptual short film directed by his longtime collaborator Colin Solal Cardo. It takes place at the famed historical Paris landmark Palais Garnier, features Christine and a group of dancers dancing to the songs from the EP, and concludes with a guest appearance from featured artist Caroline Polachek. The EP was met with widespread critical acclaim upon its release. NMEs El Hunt gave a rave review, summarizing; "conceptually, 'La Vita Nuova' is an astonishing feat – but even better than that, it also oozes an intensity of feeling that punches right in the gut." Variety called the EP "arguably [his] best work to date". "People, I've Been Sad" was recognized by Time as song of the year and also placed in the top-three of year-end critics' lists by NPR, Pitchfork, and The Guardian. The short film was included in Pitchfork's list of "The 20 Best Music Videos of 2020"; Ryan Dombal wrote: "this is art-pop cinema that's both steeped in history and gloriously unafraid to blaze its own way." Two more singles were released from La vita nuova: "I Disappear In Your Arms" on 8 June and the title track featuring Caroline Polachek on 14 August; an EP with remixes of the latter was released on 28 August.

During the 2020 COVID-19 pandemic lockdown, Letissier was one of the most active musicians in the livestream performance space, sharing a series of theatrical performances on Instagram. Also, in April, he contributed to Lady Gaga's One World: Together at Home event, and in May, he performed "People, I've Been Sad" via livestream from his Parisian home for The Late Show with Stephen Colbert. In June, Letissier performed "I Disappear In Your Arms", recorded in an empty music venue, on The Tonight Show Starring Jimmy Fallon, and then "La vita nuova", filmed inside the empty Grand Palais, on Global Citizen's 'Global Goal: Unite for Our Future' virtual benefit concert. On 2 July 2020, he debuted "Eyes of a Child", a track created for the second season of the Amazon Prime Video series Hanna; the single had been released earlier to streaming platforms on 25 February. On 25 November, French band Indochine released "3Sex" as a collaboration with Letissier, "a synth-pop dance reworking" of the band's song "" from their album 3 (1985).

On 26 September 2021, Letissier released the two-track EP Joseph, containing a cover of the George Michael song "Freedom", and the French classic song "Comme l'oiseau". On 4 November 2021, Charli XCX released "New Shapes" featuring Letissier and Caroline Polachek as the second single from her album Crash (2022).

2022–present: Redcar les adorables étoiles (prologue) and Paranoïa, Angels, True Love

Letissier first mentioned work on a third studio album in April 2020, saying that he was "looking for something very vast and hopeful" for the project. In May 2022, he collaborated with American rapper 070 Shake on "Body", a single from the latter's second studio album You Can't Kill Me. On 24 June 2022, Letissier released the lead single from his third studio album, "Je te vois enfin". The track is sung entirely in French and sees Letissier embody a "suave and sophisticated" alter ego named Redcar. His third studio album, Redcar les adorables étoiles (prologue), was released on 11 November 2022.

On 8 March 2023, Letissier released the song "To Be Honest" as the lead single from his fourth album Paranoïa, Angels, True Love. Returning to the name Christine and the Queens for the album, he described it as "the second part of an operatic gesture that also encompassed 2022's Redcar les adorables étoiles". Primarily in English, Paranoïa, Angels, True Love was co-produced by Mike Dean. It is scheduled for release on 9 June 2023 and features collaborations with Madonna and 070 Shake.

Artistry

Lyrical and musical style
Letissier prefers lyrics that are not immediately understandable. He explained that he enjoys "authors with difficult lyrics", such as Alain Bashung. His music has been labelled by music critics as pop, synthpop, electropop, indie pop, experimental pop, and art pop, while he described his own work as "freakpop".

Influences
Letissier emphasized the importance of his experience with Madame Jojo's drag club in London: "These drag artists have become my friends, they've inspired my creativity. They gave me the idea of creating a character, inventing another silhouette, another way of being in this world. Before it was a musical project, Christine was for me the answer to how to live properly. The Queens in Christine and the Queens is my tribute to them. Without the queens, I wouldn't be here".

He also said, "[he] does not want to choose between French music and English pop music" and takes influence from both. He also named Michael Jackson as his favourite male singer and "either Patti Smith or Kate Bush" as his favourite female singer. Other influences include Björk, Beyoncé, Daniel Balavoine, Fever Ray, Frank Ocean, Janet Jackson, Jimmy Jam, Terry Lewis, Mylène Farmer, Joe Jackson, Lou Reed, and Serge Gainsbourg.

Personal life

Sexuality and gender
Letissier is pansexual. In an October 2019 interview with the magazine Attitude, he explained that he is genderqueer. Having tweeted in June 2021 that he uses all pronouns, he later told The New York Times in March 2022: "My journey with gender has always been tumultuous. It's raging right now, as I'm just exploring what is beyond this. A way to express it could be switching between they and she." In August of the same year, he stated in a TikTok video in French that his gender journey was "a long process" and explained that he had gendered himself in the masculine for about a year, which he had shared with family and close friends. He subsequently updated his pronouns to he/him across social media platforms. He has stated that he is "in resistance to the approach of trans identity that there has to be hormones and operations", which he considers as a form of binarism.

Name
Letissier has used numerous personal and stage names, and remarked that he "just ha[s] many names for all the layers". He began his career as Christine and the Queens. For his second album, he shortened it to Chris, which was accompanied by a shift to a persona described as "a woman playing with masculine tropes". In October 2021, he was using the name Rahim. This sparked a debate around cultural appropriation due to the name's Arabic origin. He still occasionally uses his birth name, about which he said: "Héloïse Letissier is my parents' provenance and I love my parents. I sometimes use Héloïse to reconnect me to my childhood, but my inner child name is Manamané."

Discography

Chaleur humaine (2014)
Chris (2018)
Redcar les adorables étoiles (prologue) (2022)
Paranoïa, Angels, True Love (2023)

Awards and nominations

See also

 List of French singers
 List of French singer-songwriters

References

External links

Christine and the Queens – Because Music
Christine and the Queens – Discogs

1988 births
Living people
21st-century French singers
21st-century French LGBT people
Art pop musicians
BBC 100 Women
Because Music artists
English-language singers from France
ENS Fontenay-Saint-Cloud-Lyon alumni
French electronic musicians
French singer-songwriters
People with non-binary gender identities
French LGBT singers
Musicians from Nantes
NME Awards winners
Non-binary musicians
Pansexual musicians
Pansexual non-binary people
French non-binary people
Alternative R&B musicians
Indie pop musicians